Henriette "Henny" von Schirach (née Hoffmann; 3 February 1913 – 27 January 1992) was a German writer and wife to Baldur von Schirach, former Reichsjugendführer (Reich Youth Leader) and Gauleiter in Vienna. Henriette von Schirach is one of the few people known to have challenged Hitler personally about the persecution of Jews.

Early life 
Henriette Hoffmann was the eldest child of the photographer Heinrich Hoffmann and was born to his first wife, Therese "Nelly" Baumann (d. 1928), a former singer and actress. Along with her brother Henry (b. 1916), she spent her childhood in Schwabing. Her house was an early Nazi stronghold, and in 1920 her father, a nationalist and anti-Semitic German Workers' Party (DAP) member joined its successor, the Nazi Party. Henriette was nine years of age when she first met Adolf Hitler, who frequently came to the Hoffmann house for dinner. She described a moment when she met him when she was 17:

From 1923 onwards, her father became the personal photographer of Hitler and had a lucrative business selling busts of Hitler. By 1930, Henriette Hoffmann worked alongside her studies at the University of Munich, as Hitler's secretary. Prior to the suicide of Geli Raubal, Hitler briefly dated Henriette. Soon after in 1931, Henriette met Baldur von Schirach, the former leader of the Nazi Student League and the youngest of Hitler's entourage. The couple married on 31 March 1932 in Munich, where both Adolf Hitler and Ernst Röhm acted as best men.

Between 1933 and 1942, Henriette gave birth to four children: Angelika Benedicta, Klaus, Robert, and Richard. She also became grandmother of Ariadne von Schirach. Henriette identified herself with the goals of her husband, who held sole control over the educational system of the German Reich. He was appointed by Hitler to the Gauleiter and Reich Governor in Vienna, and moved with his family to the Vienna Hofburg.

Confrontation of Hitler
In the television programme Hitler's Henchmen (Episode, "Corrupter of the Youth", about her husband Baldur von Schirach) Dr. Henk van Capelle and Dr. Peter van de Bovenkamp recalled how Henriette von Schirach in 1943 was invited to the Netherlands by friends in the German occupation forces. A transcript is played in the programme in which she explains "I heard screaming outside the hotel late at night so went out to investigate. I saw Jewish women and children being bundled into transportation to be deported. I then asked a German soldier what they were doing to which he replied, 'What Hitler is doing in Holland is wrong, we are making enemies of the Dutch which is a big mistake, make sure you tell him this the next time you visit the Berghof'". She went on to say that what she had witnessed in Amsterdam had troubled her deeply.

Henriette broke off her visit to the Netherlands, and telephoned the Berghof to make an appointment with Hitler. Years later, for a BBC interview, Henriette explained what had happened:

Henriette von Schirach and her husband were never invited again. The incident was recounted by Traudl Junge (Hitler's last private secretary) in Blind Spot: Hitler's Secretary and Until the Final Hour-her husband,  aide-de-camp to Hitler, Hans Hermann Junge, was present.
Following the first major American air attack on Vienna, Baldur von Schirach sent his family to Bavaria to the country house Aspen Stone.

Baldur von Schirach was not the only one of the family members arrested at the end of the war. According to her memoirs, Henriette was imprisoned by the US Army for more than a year and was given the daily task of cleaning the prison's toilets. To do so, she was handed Hitler Youth flags by the prison guards. She recalled being mistreated and held in contempt by the white American guards, and that it was only the black soldiers who were decent to her. Her father, Heinrich Hoffmann, was also arrested and imprisoned so that the von Schirach children were left with no parents or grandparents to look after them. They were taken in for over some years by farming families in Southern Bavaria and attended local schools.

After the war
At the end of the war, Henriette's husband attempted to avoid capture, posing as a writer ("Dr. Richard Falk"). But he soon decided to surrender to the Americans, doing so in June 1945. He was tried and convicted at Nuremberg, being sentenced on 1 October 1946, for crimes against humanity for his deportation of the Viennese Jews. He served 20 years as a prisoner in Spandau Prison. On 20 July 1949, whilst Baldur von Schirach was imprisoned, Henriette filed for divorce, because of her romantic involvement with Peter Jacob, former husband of German film director Leni Riefenstahl. The divorce was granted a year later in July 1950.

In 1956, there was discussion in the media about the last three Nazi war criminals detained at Spandau, (Rudolf Hess, Albert Speer, and Baldur von Schirach), due to the long time for detention and high cost to the international community to imprison war criminals. Henriette Hoffman von Schirach traveled to London to the British Foreign Secretary Selwyn Lloyd in order to request a reduction of the 20-year prison sentence for her ex-husband. She was unsuccessful. That same year she published her book The Price of Glory.

In 1982, Henriette von Schirach published a book of anecdotes about Hitler, called Frauen um Hitler: Nach Materialien (Women around Hitler: After Materials). Here she describes Hitler as a "cozy Austrian", who "wanted to make himself and others a little bit happy."

In 2016, new research determined that in 1960 Henriette von Schirach had convinced authorities to return to her some 300 works of art she had owned during the war but which had originally belonged to a Jewish couple who had left the art behind when they fled Vienna. Following the war, the art had been entrusted to the Bavarian State Painting Collections, which was supposed to ensure the works were returned to their rightful owners. Instead, the Bavarian authorities sold many works back to former Nazis as so-called 'return sales'.

Notes

References
Baldur von Schirach: I Believed in Hitler, Hamburg: Mosaic Press, 1967
Henriette von Schirach (ed.): Anecdotes about Hitler; Mountain / Lake Starnberg: Watchman, 1980, 
Henriette von Schirach: Women Around Hitler, Munich: Herbig, 1983, 
Henriette von Schirach: The Price of Glory, Munich: Herbig, 1975, 
Anna Maria Sigmund: The Women of the Nazis, I, Vienna: Ueberreuter, 1998, 
Anna Maria Sigmund: The Women of the Nazis, II, Vienna: Ueberreuter, 2000, 
Guido Knopp, Hitler's Women and Marlene; Munich: Bertelsmann, 2001, 
Richard von Schirach : The Shadow of My Father, Munich, Vienna: Hanser, 2005, 
"Nazi Art Loot Returned...to Nazis", The New York Times, 15 July 2016

1913 births
1992 deaths
Henriette
20th-century German women writers
German untitled nobility
People from Munich